Rita Grande was the defending champion, but lost in the quarterfinals to Anabel Medina Garrigues.

Martina Suchá won the title by defeating Medina Garrigues 7–6(9–7), 6–1 in the final.

Seeds

Draw

Finals

Top half

Bottom half

References

External links
 Official results archive (ITF)
 Official results archive (WTA)

Tasmanian International
Tasmanian International
Hobart International